Pettnau is a municipality in the district of Innsbruck-Land in the Austrian state of Tyrol located 16.7 km west of Innsbruck north of the Inn River between Telfs and Zirl. It has seven parts and was founded around 1291.

Population

Sights
Worth seeing in Pettnau are the St. Georgskirche, which has been built in 1090 and the Mellaunerhof, the oldest inn in the Tyrol, as well as the sculpture garden of Bernhard Witsch.

References

External links

Cities and towns in Innsbruck-Land District